WTTC-FM (95.3 MHz) is a commercial FM radio station in Towanda, Pennsylvania, serving Bradford County.  WTTC-FM's license is held by Radigan Media (owned by Dave and Irene Radigan).  It is known as "95.3 The Bridge" and plays a classic rock radio format.

WTTC-FM has an effective radiated power (ERP) of 5,400 watts.  The transmitter is on Old Plank Road in Towanda.

History
The following year, the same owners put an AM station on the air, WTTC 1550 AM (now WTXW). In their early years, the two stations simulcast a full service radio format, at times playing middle of the road (MOR) music and country music. Both were network affiliates of the Mutual Broadcasting System. The two later separated their programming and today WTXW is an Adult Top 40 station.

Previously owned by Cantroair Communications, WTTC-AM-FM were sold on March 24, 2022, to Radigan Media (owned by Dave and Irene Radigan).  While owned by Cantroair WTTC-FM's sister stations were WHGL 100.3 and 102.9 FM (Wiggle 100), WTZN 1310 AM and WTTC 1550 AM "The Zone." WTTC and its translator W299CM were also sold to Radigan Media in March of 2022.

On March 30, 2022, WTTC-FM changed its format from classic hits to classic rock.

References

External links
WTTC-FM Website

TTC-FM
Classic rock radio stations in the United States